Qarahjah Aghle (also Romanized as Qarahjah Āghle; also known as Qarahchah Dāgh-e Ākhlī) is a village in Angut-e Gharbi Rural District, Anguti District, Germi County, Ardabil Province, Iran. At the 2006 census, its population was 135, in 30 families.

References 

Towns and villages in Germi County